"All Night Long" is a song by Joe Walsh, the guitarist for the Eagles. It became one of Walsh's best charting singles. A live version of the song was included on the album Eagles Live (1980). It also appears in the soundtrack to the film Urban Cowboy (1980).

Critical reception
Billboard described the work of Joe Walsh as a "wailing through the rocker that has a subtle country rock flavor", praised the guitar and a vocal performance.  Cash Box said that Walsh plays "red hot guitar" and there is "plenty of power packed into the gut-grabbing chording."

Background
Unlike the other tracks on the film's soundtrack, it does not have much to do with country music—despite its reference to chewing tobacco: "Keep a-grinning 'til the weekend comes / Just a pinch between your cheek and gum."

Chart performance

Weekly charts
One month before the film Urban Cowboy on May 11, the single entered the Billboards Hot 100 chart at the position #74; and on July 20 it peaked at #19 (for 2 weeks) and spent 16 weeks on the Hot 100, making it one of Walsh's highest-charting solo singles.  On the Canadian pop singles chart, it reached #13 for three weeks.

Year-end charts

Personnel
 Joe Walsh – lead vocals, guitars
 George "Chocolate" Perry – bass guitar
 Paul Harris – keyboards
 Joe Vitale – drums

References

External links
 

1980 singles
Joe Walsh songs
Songs written by Joe Walsh
1980 songs
Asylum Records singles
Full Moon Records singles